Belle Vue is a district of Bradford, West Yorkshire, England with a post code of BD8. It is located near Manningham Lane, home of the Belle Vue Barracks, the former Belle Vue Pub and the original location of Belle Vue Boys' Grammar School (now Beckfoot Upper Heaton). The area overlooks Valley Parade, the home of Bradford City AFC. Its name is derived from the fact that the site enjoyed a prominent view to the south and east, for which Belle Vue Terrace was known.

External links
  Belle Vue Badminton Club in Bradford

Areas of Bradford